Eriocoma occidentalis is a species of grass known by the common name western needlegrass. It is native to western North America from British Columbia to California to Colorado, where it grows in many types of habitat. The hairlike leaves are less than a millimeter wide and may have rolled edges. The awn is kinked twice.

References

External links
Jepson Manual Treatment
USDA Plants Profile
Photo gallery

Bunchgrasses of North America
Native grasses of California
Grasses of the United States
Grasses of Canada
Flora of the Sierra Nevada (United States)